Christopher Frank William Goodall (born 29 December 1955) is an English businessman, author and expert on new energy technologies. He is an alumnus of St Dunstan's College, University of Cambridge, and Harvard Business School (MBA).

Biography 

His début book How to Live a Low-Carbon Life, won the 2007 Clarion Award for non-fiction. His second book, Ten Technologies to Fix Energy and Climate, was one of the Financial Times' Books of the Year, first published in 2008 it was revised and updated in 2010. His third book, The Green Guide For Business, was published in 2010 by Profile Books. Goodall also wrote Sustainability: All That Matters, which was published in 2012 by Hodder & Stoughton.

In July 2016, The Switch was published by Profile Books, focusing on solar, storage and new energy technologies.

Goodall's What We Need To Do Now: For a Zero Carbon Future (2020,) was short-listed for the 2020 Wainwright Prize for writing on global conservation.

Goodall was the Green Party parliamentary candidate for Oxford West and Abingdon in the 2010 general election.

On the issue of UK's energy mix, Goodall used to consider that nuclear power had a role in reducing greenhouse gas emissions. Goodall once said "Including nuclear power in this mix will make a low-carbon and energy-secure future easier to achieve." However, he opposed the construction of the Hinkley C nuclear power plant.

More recently, Goodall has changed his position on nuclear and his analysis has focused on how the UK can move to a future powered by 100% renewables. This is evident from his Carbon Commentary blog and his 2020 book,What we Need to Do Now  (Page 17: 'My proposal for our route to zero carbon emissions is for a twenty-fold expansion of renewable energy', page 37: 'A few years ago, we might have thought that new nuclear generators might fill the role of renewables today. But the experience around the world of building new power stations has been almost uniformly disastrous' and page 37: 'At today's expected price levels, nuclear power would be at least twice the cost of offshore wind or solar').

Goodall helped develop the UK's first employee-owned solar PV installation in 2011 at the Eden Project. He is now a trustee of the project partner, The Ebico Trust for Sustainable Development.

The website Carbon Commentary, which is part of The Guardian Environment Network, is owned and operated by Goodall. Through Carbon Commentary he publishes a free weekly newsletter on clean energy around the world.

Goodall has also contributed a number of articles to The Guardian, the Independent, and the Ecologist among others. He has also spoken at literary festivals around the UK, at the British Library, the Science Museum and many universities.

Bibliography
 How to Live a Low-Carbon Life (2007, Earthscan)
 Ten Technologies to Save the Planet (2008, Profile Books)
 The Green Guide For Business (2010, Profile Books)
 Sustainability: All That Matters (2012, Hodder & Stoughton/Hachette)
 The Switch (2016, Profile Books)
 What We Need To Do Now: For a Zero Carbon Future (2020, Profile Books)

References

External links

Britain's top earners are worst climate offenders, says Christian author, Christian Today.
M&S private jet flies in face of green plan, The Guardian.
Walking to the shops ‘damages planet more than going by car’, Times Online.
Honk if you want to stop global warming Salon.com
How Virtuous is Ed Begley Jr.? The New York Times
When going green just doesn't add up Yorkshire Post
Ekspert: Det er miljøskadeligt at gå (DR Forside) 

Sustainability advocates
1955 births
Living people
Non-fiction environmental writers
British non-fiction writers
McKinsey & Company people
Green Party of England and Wales parliamentary candidates
Harvard Business School alumni
British male writers
Alumni of the University of Cambridge
Male non-fiction writers